Gladiators Roma are an Italian rugby league team in the Italia Rugby Football League.

History
They were formed in 2010 in the new Italian Rugby League Championship competition.

2022 Squad
Pierluigi Gentile
Andrew Tagliavento
Tury Brasca
Shane Pavan
Opeta Palepoi
Franzoni Giacomo
Rosa Marco
Giuseppe Credo
Matteo Marchetti
Stefano Arbitrio
Valerio Gentile
Alex Panetti
Michele Nitoglia
Pierpaolo Rota
Brandizzi Marco
Alfonso Damiani
Palozzi Patrizio
Cristiano Bronzini
Luca Santarcangenlo
Simone Martellucci
Giacometti Gianandrea
Cosma Garfagnoli
Emiliano Muccifora
Domenico Angelini
Andrea Diodoro
Matteo Zitelli
Gori Claudio
Leonardo Di Luia
Gabrielli Andrea

References

External links
Website on Archive.org

2010 establishments in Italy
Rugby clubs established in 2010
Italian rugby league teams
Sports clubs in Rome
Rugby league in Rome